Bohumil Stinný (born 1900, date of death unknown) was a Czech weightlifter. He competed in the men's light-heavyweight event at the 1924 Summer Olympics.

References

External links
 

1900 births
Year of death missing
Czech male weightlifters
Olympic weightlifters of Czechoslovakia
Weightlifters at the 1924 Summer Olympics
Place of birth missing